Dean Malkoc (born January 26, 1970) is a Canadian former professional ice hockey player who spent four seasons in the National Hockey League between 1995 and 1999 with the Vancouver Canucks, Boston Bruins, and New York Islanders. The rest of his career was spent in the minor leagues, in particular the American Hockey League.

Playing career
A tough, physical defender, Malkoc was selected 95th overall in the 1990 NHL Entry Draft by the New Jersey Devils. He turned professional in 1991, and spent four seasons in the Devils' system, earning a reputation for his robust play and high penalty minute totals, but never played an NHL game for New Jersey.

Malkoc became a free agent in 1995 and signed with the Vancouver Canucks, his hometown team. He managed to crack the Canucks' roster, and spent the entire 1995–96 season in the NHL as the team's seventh defender, appearing in 41 games and recording 2 assists along with 136 penalty minutes.

At the outset of the 1996–97 season, Malkoc was exposed by Vancouver in the NHL waiver draft, and claimed by the Boston Bruins. He spent two full seasons in Boston as a utility defender, appearing in 73 games. In 1997–98, he scored his first NHL goal, in his third season in the league.

Malkoc signed with the New York Islanders for the 1998–99 campaign, but only appeared in two games for the Islanders and found himself back in the minors. He was dealt to the Mighty Ducks of Anaheim the following season, and spent two seasons in the Ducks' organization without appearing in an NHL game, before retiring. He made a brief comeback to play in Austria in 2004–05 before leaving the game.

Malkoc appeared in 116 NHL games, recording one goal and three assists for four points along with 299 penalty minutes. His lone NHL goal came as a member of the Boston Bruins. It was the Bruins' fifth goal in their 10-5 loss to the Florida Panthers on November 26, 1997. He is currently a scout for the Boston Bruins.

Post-playing career
After retiring Malkoc became a scout for the Boston Bruins in 2007.

Career statistics

Regular season and playoffs

External links
 

1970 births
Living people
Albany River Rats players
Boston Bruins players
Boston Bruins scouts
Canadian ice hockey defencemen
Canadian people of Slovenian descent
Chicago Wolves (IHL) players
Cincinnati Mighty Ducks players
EC VSV players
Indianapolis Ice players
Kamloops Blazers players
Lowell Lock Monsters players
New Jersey Devils draft picks
New York Islanders players
Powell River Kings players
Providence Bruins players
Ice hockey people from Vancouver
Swift Current Broncos players
Utica Devils players
Vancouver Canucks players